Teri W. Odom is an American chemist and materials scientist. She is the Chair of the Chemistry Department, Joan Husting Madden and William H. Madden, Jr. Professor of Chemistry, and a Professor of Materials Science and Engineering at Northwestern University. She is also affiliated with International Institute for Nanotechnology (IIN), Chemistry of Life Processes Institute (CLP), Northwestern Initiative for Manufacturing Science and Innovation (NIMSI), Interdisciplinary Biological Sciences Graduate Program (IBiS), and Department of Applied Physics.

Education
Odom graduated in 1996 from Stanford University with a B.S. in chemistry. She obtained her Ph.D. in chemical physics from Harvard University in 2001 under the guidance of Charles M. Lieber. Odom conducted post-doctoral research at Harvard with George M. Whitesides from 2001 to 2002.

Career 
Odom was elected as the Chair of the Chemistry Department at Northwestern University, starting from September 1, 2018. Odom was also the associate director of International Institute for Nanotechnology at Northwestern University from 2016 to 2018. Odom was an inaugural Associate Editor for Royal Society of Chemistry's flagship journal Chemical Science (2009-2013). Odom is a member of the editorial advisory board of ACS Nano, Natural Sciences, and Accounts of Chemical Research. Odom serves on the editorial board of Nano Futures, and is currently the Editor-in-Chief of Nano Letters.

Odom was a founding Chair of the Noble Metal Nanoparticles Gordon Research Conference which began in 2010.

Research interests 
Research in Odom group focus on controlling materials at 100 nm scale and investigating their size and shape-dependent properties. Odom group has developed parallel, multi-scale pattering tools to generate hierarchical, anisotropic, and 3D hard and soft materials with applications in imaging, sensing, wetting and cancer therapeutics.

As a result of Odom's nanofabrication tools, she has developed flat optics that can manipulate light at the nanoscale and beat the diffraction limit and tunable plasmon-based lasers.

Odom also conducts research into nanoparticle-cell interactions using new biological nanoconstructs that offer imaging and therapeutic functions due to their shape (gold nanostar).

Awards and recognition

American Institute for Medical and Biological Engineering (AIMBE) Fellow, 2022
John Crano Memorial Lecturer, Akron Section of the ACS, 2022
Royal Society of Chemistry Centenary Prize, 2020
American Acadmey of Arts and Sciences Member, 2020
American Chemical Society Award in Surface Chemistry, 2020
Fellow of Optica, formerly the Optical Society of America, 2019
Fellow of the American Physical Society, 2018
Research Corpooration for Science Advancement Cottrell Scholar TREE Award, 2018
ACS Nano Lectureship Award, 2017
U.S. Department of Defense Vannevar Bush Faculty Fellow, 2017
Fellow of the American Chemical Society (ACS), 2016
Materials Research Society (MRS) Fellow, 2016
Blavatnik National Award for Young Scientists, Finalist (Chemistry), 2016
Fellow of the Royal Society of Chemistry, 2014
IPMI Carol Tyler Award, 2014
Radcliffe Institute for Advanced Study Fellow (Hrdy Fellow), Harvard University, 2011
Defense Science Study Group Member, 2010
MRS Outstanding Young Investigator Award, 2009
ACS National Fresenius Award (Phi Lambda Upsilon and ACS), 2008
NIH Director's Pioneer Award, 2008
Rohm and Haas New Faculty Award, 2007
ExxonMobil Solid State Chemistry Faculty Fellowship (ACS Inorganic), 2006
Cottrell Scholar Award (Research Corporation), 2005
DuPont Young Investigator, 2005
Alfred P. Sloan Research Fellowship, 2005
Named to the MIT Technology Review TR100 as “one of the world’s top young innovators”, 2004 
NSF CAREER Award, 2004–2008
David and Lucile Packard Foundation Fellowship, 2003–2007
Victor K. LaMer Award (ACS Colloids and Surface Chemistry), 2003
Research Innovation Award (Research Corporation), 2002
National InstiNRSA Postdoctoral Fellowship, Harvard University, 2001–2002
NSF Predoctoral Fellowship, Harvard University, 1996–99

References

External links
Northwestern Chemistry Faculty
The Odom Research Group

Living people
21st-century American chemists
American materials scientists
Northwestern University faculty
Stanford University alumni
Harvard University alumni
American women chemists
Women materials scientists and engineers
1970s births
American women academics
Solid state chemists
21st-century American women scientists
Fellows of the American Physical Society